Charles I, Landgrave of Hesse-Philippsthal (23 September 1682 – 8 May 1770) was a member of the House of Hesse and Landgrave of Hesse-Philippsthal from 1721 until his death.

Life 
Charles was the eldest son of Landgrave Philip of Hesse-Philippsthal from his marriage to Catherine Amalie (1654–1736), daughter of Count Charles Otto of Solms-Laubach.  He succeeded his father in 1721 as Charles I, Landgrave of Hesse-Philippsthal.

Charles joined the Danish army in 1701 and fought in the War of the Spanish Succession. On 10 March 1710, he distinguished himself at the Battle of Helsingborg and was promoted to Major General. In 1715 he was involved in the landing at Rügen and the subsequent siege of Stralsund.  He then joined the French army and was appointed Lieutenant General on 13 March 1721.

On 6 June 1731, he was awarded the Danish Order of the Elephant.

He later joined the Imperial military service, where he achieved the rank of Field Marshal.

Marriage and issue 
Charles married on 24 November 1725 in Eisenach Princess Caroline Christine (1699–1743), daughter of Duke John William III of Saxe-Eisenach, with whom he had the following children:
 William (1726–1810), Landgrave of Hesse-Philippsthal
 married in 1755 princess Ulrika Eleonora of Hesse-Philippsthal-Barchfeld (1732-1795)
 Caroline Amalie (1728–1746)
 Frederick (1729–1751)
 Charlotte Amalie (1730–1801) married in 1750 Duke Anton Ulrich of Saxe-Meiningen (1687–1763)
 Philippine (1731–1762)

References 
 Carl Eduard Vehse: Geschichte der deutschen Höfe seit der Reformation p. 319

Landgraves of Hesse
Danish generals
French generals
Generals of the Holy Roman Empire
House of Hesse
1682 births
1770 deaths
18th-century German military personnel